Entre Torre Infernal (Spanish for "In the Infernal Tower") was a professional wrestling Pay-Per-View (PPV) event produced by Consejo Mundial de Lucha Libre (CMLL) that took place on August 4, 2000, in Arena México, Mexico City, Mexico.

The main event of the PPV was a 4-man Steel Cage elimination match, contested under Lucha de Apuestas rules where each competitor puts his hair on the line. The rules state that a wrestler can leave the cage either by climbing over the top of the cage or by pinning an opponent; the last man in the cage would have his hair shaved off. The four wrestlers in the cage were Villaño III, Perro Aguayo, Pierroth Jr. and Máscara Año 2000. CMLL has subsequently branded the "multi-man Apuesta cage match" as Infierno en el Ring ("Inferno in the ring") instead of the Torre Infernal ("Infernal Tower") name they used for this PPV event. The undercard featured a 10-man Torneo Cibernetico where the last two wrestlers would face off in a "Mask vs. Mask" match. The event was also supposed to host the finals of a tournament for the vacant CMLL World Tag Team Championship but due to an injury to Emilio Charles Jr. Rey Bucanero and Último Guerrero won the championship by forfeit and instead had their first title defense, facing the team of Mr. Niebla (Charles Jr.'s partner) and Villaño IV. The show also featured two Six-man "Lucha Libre rules" tag team match, one for normal sized wrestlers and one for wrestlers from the Mini-Estrella, or minis, division.

Background
The event featured seven professional wrestling matches with different wrestlers involved in pre-existing scripted feuds or storylines. Wrestlers portray either villains (referred to as Rudos in Mexico) or fan favorites (Técnicos in Mexico) as they compete in wrestling matches with pre-determined outcomes.

Results

Torneo Cibernetico order of elimination

References

2000 in professional wrestling
CMLL Infierno en el Ring
Events in Mexico City